The 1928–29 season was the 37th season of The Football League.

Final league tables

The tables and results below are reproduced here with home and away statistics separated, as per RSSSF and Rothmans Book of Football League Records 1888–89 to 1978–79.

Beginning with the season 1894–95, clubs finishing level on points were separated according to goal average (goals scored divided by goals conceded), or more properly put, goal ratio. When two teams had the same goal difference, this system favoured those teams who had scored fewer goals. The goal average system was eventually scrapped beginning with the 1976–77 season. 

From the 1922–23 season, re-election was required of the bottom two teams of both Third Division North and Third Division South.

First Division

Results

Maps

Second Division

Results

Maps

Third Division North

Results

Maps

Third Division South

Results

Maps

References

English Football League seasons
Eng
1928–29 in English football leagues